NA-18 Haripur is a constituency for the National Assembly of Pakistan. It covers tho whole of district Haripur. The constituency was formerly known as NA-19 (Haripur) from 1977 to 2018. The name changed to NA-17 (Haripur) after the delimitation in 2018 and to NA-18 (Haripur) after the delimitation in 2022.

Members of Parliament

1977–2002: NA-19 Haripur

2002–2018: NA-19 Haripur

2018-2023: NA-17 Haripur

Detailed results

2002 general election

A total of 6,277 votes were rejected.

2008 general election

A total of 5,757 votes were rejected.

2013 general election

A total of 8,467 votes were rejected.

2015 By-election
A by-election took place on 16 August 2015.

A total of 3,918 votes were rejected.

2018 general election 

General elections were held on 25 July 2018. The constituency got the third-highest total votes polled in all of Pakistan. Omar Ayub Khan of Pakistan Tehreek-e-Insaf won, getting the most votes by any candidate in all of Pakistan.

2023 By-election 
A by-election will be held on 16 March 2023 due to the resignation of Omar Ayub Khan, the previous MNA from this seat.

See also
NA-17 Abbottabad-II
NA-19 Swabi-I

References

External links 
Election result's official website

17
17